LA Youth was a newspaper by and about Los Angeles teens, published monthly from January 1988 to January 2013, and was distributed to more than 1,400 Los Angeles county public/private schools, libraries, and youth organizations.

High school teenagers (grades 9–12) were the group of journalists, known as staff writers, who work on each monthly publication. Even eighth grade (8th grade) students who want to become involved, could attend staff meetings, network with others, and contribute to the paper.  

The staff writers prepared each issue by attending Saturday staff meetings, held at the LA Youth office in the Fairfax District. At the meetings, staff writers met with the adult staff and newcomer students. Students and staff writers were always encouraged to bring in friends and siblings, to broaden the number of students involved on the paper, and have 'L.A. youth' voices heard.

The meeting consisted of each writer/student presenting himself/herself to the rest of the students, such as what school he/she went to, what he liked to do for fun, and where he was planning to attend college. Students at the meetings came from different schools and cities, such as the San Fernando Valley, West Los Angeles, inner Los Angeles, and East Los Angeles. With the diversity of students, each student was able to share their different opinions about school graduation requirements, recent police enforcement misconduct, crime and violence, and other controversial news.

Every topic discussed at the staff meetings acted as an informative/planning/thinking-ahead/ready to succeed, factor. The adult staff always motivated its youth, being sure that students whom represent the paper were hard-workers and motivated learners.

After student presentations at the meeting, the adult staff took over by asking if current articles have been revised or finished. If any staff member was having an issue, he/she could share it with the group and receive support. Even sharing an issue could give another staff writer an idea to write an article. If the adult staff agreed it's an important issue to discuss, then the writer could begin brainstorming, find other interested writers, and write the article. Writers had a variety of methods in writing for the paper. They could write articles in personal tone, reporter tone, and even add polls and quotations from people. Students with photography and art talent could contribute to an article by doing photography or drawings that pertain to a specific topic.

The most written about articles on LA Youth were personal experiences, which taught the reader how to handle certain life situations; or articles on doing what's best for one's own personal record.

References

External links
LA Youth official site

Newspapers published in Greater Los Angeles